Ahmed Al-Rehaili Al-Harbi (born 6 October 1994) is a Saudi Arabian professional footballer who plays as a goalkeeper for Saudi club Al-Raed.

Honours

Club
Al-Ahli
Saudi Champions Cup: 2016
Saudi Professional League: 2015–16

External links
 

1994 births
Living people
Saudi Arabian footballers
Saudi Arabia youth international footballers
Sportspeople from Mecca
Association football goalkeepers
Al-Ahli Saudi FC players
Al-Raed FC players
Saudi Professional League players